Tanzania, officially the United Republic of Tanzania, is a country in East Africa within the African Great Lakes region. It borders Uganda to the north; Kenya to the northeast; the Indian Ocean to the east; Mozambique and Malawi to the south; Zambia to the southwest; and Rwanda, Burundi, and the Democratic Republic of the Congo to the west. Mount Kilimanjaro, Africa's highest mountain, is in northeastern Tanzania. According to 2022 national census, Tanzania has a population of nearly 62 million, making it the fifth largest in Africa.

Many important hominid fossils have been found in Tanzania, such as 6-million-year-old Pliocene hominid fossils. The genus Australopithecus ranged across Africa between 4 and 2 million years ago, and the oldest remains of the genus Homo are found near Lake Olduvai. Following the rise of Homo erectus 1.8 million years ago, humanity spread all over the Old World, and later in the New World and Australia under the species Homo sapiens. H. sapiens also overtook Africa and absorbed the older species of humanity. Later in the Stone and Bronze Age, prehistoric migrations into Tanzania included Southern Cushitic speakers who moved south from present-day Ethiopia; Eastern Cushitic people who moved into Tanzania from north of Lake Turkana about 2,000 and 4,000 years ago; and the Southern Nilotes, including the Datoog, who originated from the present-day South Sudan–Ethiopia border region between 2,900 and 2,400 years ago. These movements took place at about the same time as the settlement of the Mashariki Bantu from West Africa in the Lake Victoria and Lake Tanganyika areas. They subsequently migrated across the rest of Tanzania between 2,300 and 1,700 years ago.

In the late 19th century the mainland came under German rule as German East Africa, and this was followed by British rule after World War I when it was governed as Tanganyika, with the Zanzibar Archipelago remaining a separate colonial jurisdiction. Following their respective independence in 1961 and 1963, the two entities merged in 1964 to form the United Republic of Tanzania. Tanganyika joined the British Commonwealth and Tanzania remains a member of the Commonwealth as a unified republic. Today the country is a presidential constitutional republic with the federal capital located in Dodoma; the former capital, Dar es Salaam, retains most government offices and is the country's largest city, principal port, and leading commercial centre. Tanzania is a de facto one-party state with the democratic socialist Chama Cha Mapinduzi party in power. The country has not experienced major internal strife since independence and is seen as one of the safest and most politically stable on the continent.

Tanzania's population is composed of about 120 ethnic, linguistic, and religious groups.  Christianity is the largest religion in Tanzania, but there are also substantial Muslim and animist minorities. Over 100 different languages are spoken in Tanzania, making it the most linguistically diverse country in East Africa; the country does not have a de jure official language, although the national language is Swahili which is used in parliamentary debate, in the lower courts, and as a medium of instruction in primary school, spoken by up to 90% as a second language. English is used in foreign trade, in diplomacy, in higher courts, and as a medium of instruction in secondary and higher education, while Arabic is spoken in Zanzibar.

Tanzania is mountainous and densely forested in the north-east, where Mount Kilimanjaro is located. Three of Africa's Great Lakes are partly within Tanzania. To the north and west lie Lake Victoria, Africa's largest lake, and Lake Tanganyika, the continent's deepest lake, known for its unique species of fish. To the south lies Lake Malawi. The eastern shore is hot and humid, with the Zanzibar Archipelago just offshore. The Menai Bay Conservation Area is Zanzibar's largest marine protected area. The Kalambo Falls, located on the Kalambo River at the Zambian border, is the second-highest uninterrupted waterfall in Africa. Tanzania is one of the most visited tourist destinations for safaris.

Etymology
The name "Tanzania" was created as a clipped compound of the names of the two states that unified to create the country: Tanganyika and Zanzibar. It consists of the first three letters of the names of the two states ("Tan" and "Zan") and the suffix, "ia" to form Tanzania.

The name "Tanganyika" is derived from the Swahili words tanga ("sail") and nyika ("uninhabited plain", "wilderness"), creating the phrase "sail in the wilderness". It is sometimes understood as a reference to Lake Tanganyika.

The name of Zanzibar comes from "zenji", the name for a local people (said to mean "black"), and the Arabic word "barr", which means coast or shore.

History

Ancient
Tanzania is one of the oldest continuously inhabited areas on Earth. Traces of fossil remains of humans and hominids date back to the Quaternary era. The Olduvai Gorge, in the Ngorongoro Conservation Area, a UNESCO World Heritage Site, features a collection with remnants of tools that document the development and use of transitional technology.

The indigenous populations of eastern Africa are thought to be the linguistically isolated Hadza and Sandawe hunter-gatherers of Tanzania.

The first wave of migration was by Southern Cushitic speakers who moved south from Ethiopia and Somalia into Tanzania. They are ancestral to the Iraqw, Gorowa, and Burunge. Based on linguistic evidence, there may also have been two movements into Tanzania of Eastern Cushitic people at about 4,000 and 2,000 years ago, originating from north of Lake Turkana.

Archaeological evidence supports the conclusion that Southern Nilotes, including the Datoog, moved south from the present-day South Sudan / Ethiopia border region into central northern Tanzania between 2,900 and 2,400 years ago.

These movements took place at approximately the same time as the settlement of the iron-making Mashariki Bantu from West Africa in the Lake Victoria and Lake Tanganyika areas. They brought with them the west African planting tradition and the primary staple of yams. They subsequently migrated out of these regions across the rest of Tanzania between 2,300 and 1,700 years ago.

Eastern Nilotic peoples, including the Maasai, represent a more recent migration from present-day South Sudan within the past 500 to 1,500 years.

The people of Tanzania have been associated with the production of iron and steel. The Pare people were the main producers of sought-after iron for peoples who occupied the mountain regions of north-eastern Tanzania. The Haya people on the western shores of Lake Victoria invented a type of high-heat blast furnace, which allowed them to forge carbon steel at temperatures exceeding  more than 1,500 years ago.

Travellers and merchants from the Persian Gulf and India have visited the east African coast since early in the first millennium AD. Islam was practised by some on the Swahili Coast as early as the eighth or ninth century AD.

Medieval
Bantu-speakers built farming and trade villages along the Tanzanian coast from the outset of the first millennium. Archaeological finds at Fukuchani, on the north-west coast of Zanzibar, indicate a settled agricultural and fishing community from the 6th century CE at the latest. The considerable amount of daub found indicates timber buildings, and shell beads, bead grinders, and iron slag have been found at the site. There is evidence for limited engagement in long-distance trade: a small amount of imported pottery has been found, less than 1% of total pottery finds, mostly from the Gulf and dated to the 5th to 8th century. The similarity to contemporary sites such as Mkokotoni and Dar es Salaam indicate a unified group of communities that developed into the first centre of coastal maritime culture. The coastal towns appear to have been engaged in Indian Ocean and inland African trade at this early period. Trade rapidly increased in importance and quantity beginning in the mid-8th century and by the close of the 10th century Zanzibar was one of the central Swahili trading towns.

Growth in Egyptian and Persian shipping from the Red Sea and the Persian Gulf revitalised Indian Ocean trade, particularly after the Fatimid Caliphate relocated to Fustat (Cairo). Swahili agriculturalists built increasingly dense settlements to tap into trade, these forming the earliest Swahili city-states. The Venda-Shona Kingdoms of Mapungubwe and Zimbabwe in South Africa and Zimbabwe, respectively, became a major producer of gold around this same period. Economic, social, and religious power was increasingly vested in Kilwa, Tanzania's major medieval city-state. Kilwa controlled a number of smaller ports stretching down to modern-day Mozambique. Sofala became the major gold emporium and Kilwa grew rich off the trade, lying at the southern end of the Indian Ocean Monsoons. Kilwa's major rivals lay to the north, in modern-day Kenya, namely Mombasa and Malindi. Kilwa remained the major power in East Africa until the arrival of the Portuguese at the end of the 15th century.

Colonial

Claiming the coastal strip, Omani Sultan Said bin Sultan moved his capital to Zanzibar City in 1840. During this time, Zanzibar became the centre for the east African slave trade. Between 65 and 90 per cent of the Arab-Swahili population of Zanzibar was enslaved. One of the most infamous slave traders on the East African coast was Tippu Tip, who was the grandson of an enslaved African. The Nyamwezi slave traders operated under the leadership of Msiri and Mirambo. According to Timothy Insoll, "Figures record the exporting of 718,000 slaves from the Swahili coast during the 19th century, and the retention of 769,000 on the coast." In the 1890s, slavery was abolished.

In 1863, the Holy Ghost Mission established an early reception center and depot at Zanzibar. In 1877, responding to appeals of Henry Stanley following his trans-Africa expedition, and permission being given to Stanley by King Mutessa I of Buganda of Buganda, the Church Missionary Society sent missionaries Edward Baxter and Henry Cole to establish inland missions. In 1885, Germany conquered the regions that are now Tanzania (minus Zanzibar) and incorporated them into German East Africa (GEA). The Supreme Council of the 1919 Paris Peace Conference awarded all of GEA to Britain on 7 May 1919, over the strenuous objections of Belgium. The British colonial secretary, Alfred Milner, and Belgium's minister plenipotentiary to the conference, then negotiated the Anglo-Belgian agreement of 30 May 1919 where Britain ceded the north-western GEA provinces of Ruanda and Urundi to Belgium. The conference's Commission on Mandates ratified this agreement on 16 July 1919. The Supreme Council accepted the agreement on 7 August 1919. On 12 July 1919, the Commission on Mandates agreed that the small Kionga Triangle south of the Rovuma River would be given to Portuguese Mozambique, with it eventually becoming part of independent Mozambique. The commission reasoned that Germany had virtually forced Portugal to cede the triangle in 1894. The Treaty of Versailles was signed on 28 June 1919, although the treaty did not take effect until 10 January 1920. On that date, the GEA was transferred officially to Britain, Belgium, and Portugal. Also on that date, "Tanganyika" became the name of the British territory. In the mid-1920s, the British implemented a system of indirect rule in Tanzania.

The Maji-Maji rebellion, between 1905 and 1907, was an uprising of several African tribes in German East Africa against the colonial authorities, in particular because of forced labor and deportation of certain tribes. It was the subject of a bloody repression, which combined with famine caused 300 000 deaths among the population.

During World War II, about 100,000 people from Tanganyika joined the Allied forces and were among the 375,000 Africans who fought with those forces. Tanganyikans fought in units of the King's African Rifles during the East African Campaign in Somalia and Abyssinia against the Italians, in Madagascar against the Vichy French during the Madagascar Campaign, and in Burma against the Japanese during the Burma Campaign. Tanganyika was an important source of food during this war, and its export income increased greatly compared to the pre-war years of the Great Depression Wartime demand, however, caused increased commodity prices and massive inflation within the colony.

In 1954, Julius Nyerere transformed an organisation into the politically oriented Tanganyika African National Union (TANU). TANU's main objective was to achieve national sovereignty for Tanganyika. A campaign to register new members was launched, and within a year, TANU had become the leading political organisation in the country. Nyerere became Minister of British-administered Tanganyika in 1960 and continued as prime minister when Tanganyika became independent in 1961.

Modern
British rule came to an end on 9 December 1961. Elizabeth II, who had acceded to the British throne in 1952, continued to reign through the first year of Tanganyika's independence, but now distinctly as Queen of Tanganyika, represented by the governor general. Tanganyika also joined the British Commonwealth in 1961. On 9 December 1962, Tanganyika became a democratic republic under an executive president.

After the Zanzibar Revolution overthrew the Arab dynasty in neighbouring Zanzibar, accompanied with the slaughter of thousands of Arab Zanzibaris, which had become independent in 1963, the archipelago merged with mainland Tanganyika on 26 April 1964. The new country was then named the United Republic of Tanganyika and Zanzibar. On 29 October of the same year, the country was renamed the United Republic of Tanzania ("Tan" comes from Tanganyika and "Zan" from Zanzibar). The union of the two hitherto separate regions was controversial among many Zanzibaris (even those sympathetic to the revolution) but was accepted by both the Nyerere government and the Revolutionary Government of Zanzibar owing to shared political values and goals.

Following Tanganyika's independence and unification with Zanzibar leading to the state of Tanzania, President Nyerere emphasised a need to construct a national identity for the citizens of the new country. To achieve this, Nyerere provided what is regarded as one of the most successful cases of ethnic repression and identity transformation in Africa. With more than 130 languages spoken within its territory, Tanzania is one of the most ethnically diverse countries in Africa. Despite this obstacle, ethnic divisions remained rare in Tanzania when compared to the rest of the continent, notably its immediate neighbour, Kenya. Furthermore, since its independence, Tanzania has displayed more political stability than most African countries, particularly due to Nyerere's ethnic repression methods.

In 1967, Nyerere's first presidency took a turn to the left after the Arusha Declaration, which codified a commitment to socialism as well as Pan-Africanism. After the declaration, banks and many large industries were nationalised.

Tanzania was also aligned with China, which from 1970 to 1975 financed and helped build the  TAZARA Railway from Dar es Salaam to Zambia. Nonetheless, from the late 1970s, Tanzania's economy took a turn for the worse, in the context of an international economic crisis affecting both developed and developing economies.

In 1978, the neighbouring Uganda, under the leadership of Idi Amin, invaded Tanzania. This disastrous invasion would culminate in Tanzania invading Uganda with the aid of Ugandan rebels and deposing Idi Amin as a result. However, the war severely damaged Tanzania's economy.

Through the 1980s, conservation oriented national parks such as Serengeti and Kilimanjaro, with Mount Kilimanjaro as the tallest freestanding summit on Earth, were included on the UNESCO World Heritage List.

From the mid-1980s, the regime financed itself by borrowing from the International Monetary Fund and underwent some reforms. Since then, Tanzania's gross domestic product per capita has grown and poverty has been reduced, according to a report by the World Bank.

In 1992, the Constitution of Tanzania was amended to allow multiple political parties. In Tanzania's first multi-party elections, held in 1995, the ruling Chama Cha Mapinduzi won 186 of the 232 elected seats in the National Assembly, and Benjamin Mkapa was elected as president.

The presidents of Tanzania since Independence have been Julius Nyerere 1962–1985, Ali Hassan Mwinyi 1985–1995, Benjamin Mkapa 1995–2005 Jakaya Kikwete 2005–2015 John Magufuli 2015–2021 and Samia Hassan Suluhu since 2021. After the long tenure of president Nyerere, the Constitution has a term limit: a president can serve a maximum of two terms. Each term is five years. Every president has represented the ruling party Chama cha Mapinduzi (CCM). President Magufuli won a landslide victory and re-election in October 2020. According to the opposition, the election was full of fraud and irregularities.

On 17 March 2021, President John Magufuli died from heart complications while in office. Magufuli's vice president, Samia Suluhu Hassan, became Tanzania's first female president.

Geography

At , Tanzania is the 13th largest country in Africa and the 31st largest in the world, ranked between the larger Egypt and smaller Nigeria. It borders Kenya and Uganda to the north; Rwanda, Burundi, and the Democratic Republic of the Congo to the west; and Zambia, Malawi, and Mozambique to the south. It also incorporates several offshore islands, including Unguja (Zanzibar), Pemba, and Mafia.

Tanzania is mountainous and densely forested in the northeast, where Mount Kilimanjaro is located. Three of Africa's Great Lakes are partly within Tanzania. To the north and west lie Lake Victoria, Africa's largest lake, and Lake Tanganyika, the continent's deepest lake, known for its unique species of fish. To the southwest lies Lake Nyasa. Central Tanzania is a large plateau, with plains and arable land. The eastern shore is hot and humid, with the Zanzibar Archipelago just offshore.

Kalambo Falls in the southwestern region of Rukwa is the second highest uninterrupted waterfall in Africa, and is located near the southeastern shore of Lake Tanganyika on the border with Zambia. The Menai Bay Conservation Area is Zanzibar's largest marine protected area.

Climate

Climate varies greatly within Tanzania. In the highlands, temperatures range between  during cold and hot seasons respectively. The hottest period extends between November and February while the coldest period occurs between May and August. The climate is cool in high mountainous regions.

Tanzania has two major rainfall periods: one is uni-modal (October–April) and the other is bi-modal (October–December and March–May). The former is experienced in southern, central, and western parts of the country, and the latter is found in the north from Lake Victoria extending east to the coast. The bi-modal rainfall is caused by the seasonal migration of the Intertropical Convergence Zone.

Climate change in Tanzania is resulting in rising temperatures with a higher likelihood of intense rainfall events (resulting in flooding) and of dry spells (resulting in droughts). Climate change is already impacting the sectors in Tanzania of agriculture, water resources, health and energy. Sea level rise and changes in the quality of water are expected to impact fisheries and aquaculture.

Tanzania produced a National Adaptation Programmes of Action (NAPAs) in 2007 as mandated by the United Nations Framework Convention on Climate Change. In 2012, Tanzania produced a National Climate Change Strategy in response to the growing concern of the negative impacts of climate change and climate variability on the country's social, economic and physical environment.

Wildlife and conservation

Tanzania contains around 20% of the species of Africa's enormous warm-blooded animal populace, found over its 21 National parks, reserves, 1 conservation area, and 3 marine parks. Spread over a zone of in excess of 42,000 square kilometres (16,000 sq. mi) and shaping around 38% of the nation's area. Tanzania has 21 national parks, plus a variety of game and forest reserves, including the Ngorongoro Conservation Area, however there so many people who live in Ngorongoro and try to affect the environment.  In western Tanzania, Gombe Stream National Park is the site of Jane Goodall's ongoing study of chimpanzee behaviour, which started in 1960.

Tanzania is highly biodiverse and contains a wide variety of animal habitats. On Tanzania's Serengeti plain, white-bearded wildebeest (Connochaetes taurinus mearnsi), other bovids and zebra participate in a large-scale annual migration. Tanzania is home to about 130 amphibian and over 275 reptile species, many of them strictly endemic and included in the International Union for Conservation of Nature's Red Lists of countries. Tanzania has the largest lion population in the world.

Tanzania had a 2019 Forest Landscape Integrity Index mean score of 7.13/10, ranking it 54th globally out of 172 countries.

Politics

Government

Tanzania is a one-party dominant state with the Chama Cha Mapinduzi (CCM) party in power. From its formation until 1992, it was the only legally permitted party in the country. This changed on 1 July 1992, when the constitution was amended. It has held power since independence in 1961, and is the longest-serving ruling party in Africa.

John Magufuli won the October 2015 presidential election and secured a two-thirds majority in parliament. The main opposition party in Tanzania since multiparty politics in 1992 is called Chama cha Demokrasia na Maendeleo (Chadema) (Swahili for "Party for Democracy and Progress"). The leader of Chadema party is Freeman Mbowe.

In Zanzibar, the country's semi-autonomous state, The Alliance for Change and Transparency-Wazalendois (ACT-Wazalendo) is considered the main opposition political party. The constitution of Zanzibar requires the party that comes in second in the polls to join a coalition with the winning party. ACT-Wazalendo joined a coalition government with the islands' ruling party Chama Cha Mapinduzi in December 2020 after Zanzibar disputed elections.

In November 2020, Magufuli once again was declared the winner for his second term as president. Election fraud was suspected. The national electoral commission announced that Magufuli received 84%, or about 12.5 million votes and the top opposition candidate, Tundu Lissu received 13%, about 1.9 million votes.

In March 2021, it was announced that Magufuli had died whilst serving in office, meaning that his vice president, Samia Suluhu Hassan, became the country's president.

Executive

The president of Tanzania and the members of the National Assembly are elected concurrently by direct popular vote for five-year terms. The vice-president is elected for a five-year term at the same time as the president and on the same ticket. Neither the president nor the vice-president may be a member of the National Assembly. The president appoints a prime minister, subject to confirmation by the assembly, to serve as the government's leader in the assembly. The president selects her cabinet from assembly members. Law enforcement in Tanzania is under the executive branch of government and is administered by the Tanzania Police Force.

Legislature
All legislative power relating to mainland Tanzania and union matters is vested in the National Assembly, which is unicameral and has a maximum of 357 members. These include members elected to represent constituencies, the attorney general, five members elected by the Zanzibar house of representatives from among its own members, the special women's seats that constitute at least 30% of the seats that any party has in the assembly, the speaker of the assembly (if not otherwise a member of the assembly), and the persons (not more than ten) appointed by the president. The Tanzania Electoral Commission demarcates the mainland into constituencies in the number determined by the commission with the consent of the president.

Judiciary

Tanzania's legal system is based on English common law.

Tanzania has a four-level judiciary. The lowest-level courts on the Tanzanian mainland are the Primary Courts. In Zanzibar, the lowest-level courts are the Kadhi's Courts for Islamic family matters and the Primary Courts for all other cases. On the mainland, appeal is to either the District Courts or the Resident Magistrates Courts. In Zanzibar, appeal is to the Kadhi's Appeal Courts for Islamic family matters and the Magistrates Courts for all other cases. From there, appeal is to the High Court of Mainland Tanzania or Zanzibar. No appeal regarding Islamic family matters can be made from the High Court of Zanzibar. Otherwise, the final appeal is to the Court of Appeal of Tanzania.

The High Court of mainland Tanzania has three divisions – commercial, labour, and land – and 15 geographic zones. The High Court of Zanzibar has an industrial division, which hears only labour disputes.

Mainland and union judges are appointed by the Chief Justice of Tanzania, except for those of the Court of Appeal and the High Court, who are appointed by the president of Tanzania.

Tanzania is a party to the Rome Statute of the International Criminal Court.

Zanzibar

The legislative authority in Zanzibar over all non-union matters is vested in the House of Representatives (per the Tanzania constitution) or the Legislative Council (per the Zanzibar constitution).

The Legislative Council has two parts: the president of Zanzibar and the House of Representatives. The president is Zanzibar's head of government and the chairman of the Revolutionary Council, in which the executive authority of Zanzibar is invested. Zanzibar has two vice-presidents, with the first being from the main opposition party in the house. The second is from the party in power and is the leader of government business in the House.

The president and the members of the House of Representatives have five-year terms and can be elected for a second term.

The president selects ministers from members of the House of Representatives, with the ministers allocated according to the number of House seats won by political parties. The Revolutionary Council consists of the president, both vice-presidents, all ministers, the attorney general of Zanzibar, and other house members deemed fit by the president.

The House of Representatives is composed of elected members, ten members appointed by the president, all the regional commissioners of Zanzibar, the attorney general, and appointed female members whose number must be equal to 30 per cent of the elected members. The House determines the number of its elected members with the Zanzibar Electoral Commission determining the boundaries of each election constituency. In 2013, the House had 81 members: fifty elected members, five regional commissioners, the attorney general, ten members appointed by the president, and fifteen appointed female members.

Administrative subdivisions

In 1972, local government on the mainland was abolished and replaced with direct rule from the central government. Local government, however, was reintroduced in the beginning of the 1980s, when the rural councils and rural authorities were re-established. Local government elections took place in 1983, and functioning councils started in 1984. In 1999, a Local Government Reform Programme was enacted by the National Assembly, setting "a comprehensive and ambitious agenda ... [covering] four areas: political decentralization, financial decentralization, administrative decentralization and changed central-local relations, with the mainland government having overriding powers within the framework of the Constitution."

As of 2016, Tanzania is divided into thirty-one regions (mkoa), twenty-six on the mainland and five in Zanzibar (three on  Unguja, two on Pemba). In 2012, the thirty former regions were divided into 169 districts (wilaya), also known as local government authorities. Of those districts, 34 were urban units, which were further classified as three city councils (Arusha, Mbeya, and Mwanza), nineteen municipal councils, and twelve town councils.

The urban units have an autonomous city, municipal, or town council and are subdivided into wards and mtaa. The non-urban units have an autonomous district council but are subdivided into village councils or township authorities (first level) and then into vitongoji.

The city of Dar es Salaam is unique because it has a city council whose area of jurisdiction overlaps three municipal councils. The mayor of the city council is elected by that council. The twenty-member city council is composed of eleven persons elected by the municipal councils, seven members of the National Assembly, and "Nominated members of parliament under 'Special Seats' for women". Each municipal council also has a mayor. "The City Council performs a coordinating role and attends to issues cutting across the three municipalities", including security and emergency services. The city of Mwanza has a city council whose areal jurisdiction overlaps two municipal councils.

Foreign policies and partnerships

Foreign Policies of Tanzania are in process of review to replace the current New Foreign Policy of 2001, which was the first official foreign policy of Tanzania. Before 2001, Tanzanian foreign policy was dictated by the various presidential declarations of Mwalimu Nyerere specifically Circular No. 2 of 1964, Arusha Declaration, and Policy of Foreign Affairs of 1967. These declarations had focused foreign policy primarily on independence and sovereignty, human rights, and African unity. The current New Foreign Policy of 2001 was established to better address the end of colonialism and the cold war, globalization, market economics and liberalization, and the multi-party state of Tanzania. Its primary focus is economic diplomacy and development.

New Foreign Policy of 2001, which is still used today, has a foundation of 7 principles; sovereignty, liberalism, good neighborliness, African unity, non-alignment, economic diplomacy, and global cooperation for economic development and peace. The primary objectives are outlined as the protection and promotion of cultural and economic interests, establishment of relations with other nations driven by economic interest, economic self-sufficiency, internal and global peace, and regional political and economic integration.

A review of current foreign policy is being undertaken by the sixth phase government to replace the current New Foreign Policy of 2001. Foreign Affairs Minister Liberata Mulamula has stated the new policies will maintain the priority of and non-alignment of the 2001 policy while making additional top priorities the climate change and refocusing economic diplomacy with a greater focus on value-added exports and the digital economy.

International partnerships 

Tanzania is a member of many international organizations such as the United Nations (UN), African Union (AU), East African Community (EAC), and Southern African Development Community (SADC) among many others. Additionally, due to the strength of Tanzania's non-alignment, unity and internal peace since independence, Tanzania frequently acts as a mediator and location of treaties and agreements between other nations, such as the Arusha Agreement with Europe, as well as the Arusha Accords with Rwanda (1993) and Burundi (2000).

The United Nations has a large current and historical presence in Tanzania and acts as an important partner in itself, and associated IGOs and NGOs, in many functions in the country, as well as functions based in Tanzania and implemented throughout the Great Lakes and Africa as a whole. Of the many functions, the UN and Tanzania partner or the UN works with outside countries, most notably human rights and justice courts and reporting, education, development, climate change, health, and wildlife conservation. While the UN primary offices are in Oysterbay, Dar es Salaam, many other offices, courts, and NGOs are based in Arusha, TZ. The most well-known example is the International Criminal Tribunal for Rwanda genocide.

The African Union consists of 55 nations in Africa. Tanzania is a founding member of the AU in 2001, and its predecessor the Organisation of African Unity (OAU) by the predecessors of Tanzania, Tanganyika and Zanzibar, in 1963. The Judicial Branch of the AU and its courts are located in Tanzania. Originally the Court of Justice of the African Union, it has been combined with the African Court on Human and Peoples' Rights to form the African Court of Justice and Human Rights (ACJHR) which is located in Arusha. Tanzania ratified and joined the AU-brokered African Continental Free Trade Area (AfCFTA) on 17 January 2022, the largest free trade area in the world.

The East African Community consisting of Tanzania, Uganda, Kenya, Rwanda, Burundi, South Sudan, and the Democratic Republic of Congo (DRC) is headquartered in Arusha. Tanzania, along with Kenya and Uganda, is a founding member of the EAC in 2000. Following the German defeat in World War I Tanzania joined the London-based East African Currency Board (EACB) that was a customs union and provider of currency for Tanzania, Uganda, and Kenya from 1919 to 1948, the East Africa High Commission (EAHC) from 1948 to 1961, and East African Common Services Organization (EACSO) from 1961 to 1966. In 1966 all three countries formed the first East African Community which lasted until 1976, then the East African Co-operation from 1993 to 2000, before becoming reestablished as the East African Community in 2000.

The EAC has had a customs union since 2005, with a free trade zone between member states and unified tariffs and trade agreements with non-member states and multinational organizations. The customs union also established a unified organization and sets of rules, such as rules of origin, for all trade within, into, and passing through member states. In 2010 a common market was established within the EAC for the free movement of labor, goods, people, capital, and services, as well as established rights of establishment. The East African Monetary Union (EAMU) is proposed to be established in 2024 that will create a single common currency by the East African Central Bank. From the original reestablishment of the EAC, as laid out in Article 5(2) of the Treaty for the Establishment of the East African Community, the final goal for the EAC is always the political federation of all member states. In 2017 all member states adopted the confederation of EAC as a transitional precursor to the final federation.

The Southern African Development Community consists of 16 nations, including all countries of southern Africa plus Tanzania and the DRC from the Great Lakes. Tanzania is a founding member of SADC in 1994, as well as its predecessor the Frontline States (FLS), from 1960 to 1994. While FLS aimed to end apartheid, its successor SADC has the aims of furthering peace and security along with the economic and political integration of member states.

Military

The Tanzania People's Defence Force (TPDF) (Kiswahili: Jeshi la Wananchi wa Tanzania (JWTZ)) is the armed forces of Tanzania, operating as a people's force under civilian control. It is composed of five branches or commands: Land Force (army), Air Force, Naval Command, National Service, Headquarter (MMJ). Tanzanian citizens are able to volunteer for military service from 15 years of age, and 18 years of age for compulsory National military service upon graduation from advanced secondary school. Conscript service obligation was 2 years as of 2004.

Human rights

Throughout Tanzania, sex acts between men are illegal and carry a maximum penalty of life imprisonment. According to a 2007 Pew Research Centre survey, 95 percent of Tanzanians believed that homosexuality should not be accepted by society.

People with albinism living in Tanzania are often attacked, killed or mutilated because of superstitions related to the black-magical practice known as muti that say body parts of albinos have magical properties. Tanzania has the highest occurrence of this human rights violation among 27 African countries where muti is known to be practised.

In December 2019, Amnesty International reported that the Tanzanian government annulled the right of NGOs as well as individuals to directly file any case against it at the Arusha-based African Court for Human and Peoples' Rights.

Economy and infrastructure

, according to the IMF, Tanzania's gross domestic product (GDP) was an estimated $71 billion (nominal), or $218.5 billion on a purchasing power parity (PPP) basis. GDP per capita (PPP) was $3,574.

From 2009 through to 2013, Tanzania's per capita GDP (based on constant local currency) grew an average of 3.5% per year, higher than any other member of the East African Community (EAC) and exceeded by only nine countries in Sub-Saharan Africa: the Democratic Republic of the Congo, Ethiopia, Ghana, Lesotho, Liberia, Mozambique, Sierra Leone, Zambia, and Zimbabwe.

Tanzania's largest trading partners in 2017 for its US$5.3 billion in exports were India, Vietnam, South Africa, Switzerland, and China. Its imports totalled US$8.17 billion, with India, Switzerland, Saudi Arabia, China, and the United Arab Emirates being the biggest partners.

Tanzania weathered the Great Recession, which began in late 2008 or early 2009, relatively well. Strong gold prices, bolstering the country's mining industry, and Tanzania's poor integration into global markets helped to insulate the country from the downturn. Since the recession ended, the Tanzanian economy has expanded rapidly thanks to strong tourism, telecommunications, and banking sectors.

According to the United Nations Development Programme, however, recent growth in the national economy has benefited only the "very few", leaving out the majority of the population. Tanzania's 2013 Global Hunger Index was worse than any other country in the EAC except Burundi. The proportion of persons who were undernourished in 2010–12 was also worse than any other EAC country except Burundi.

In 2020, the World Bank declared the rise of the Tanzanian economy from low income to lower middle income country, as its GNI per capita increased from US$1,020 in 2018 to US$1,080 in 2019.

Hunger and poverty
The Global Hunger Index ranked the situation as "alarming" with a score of 42 in the year 2000; since then the GHI has declined to 29.5. Children in rural areas suffer substantially higher rates of malnutrition and chronic hunger, although urban-rural disparities have narrowed as regards both stunting and underweight. Low rural sector productivity arises mainly from inadequate infrastructure investment; limited access to farm inputs, extension services and credit; limited technology as well as trade and marketing support; and heavy dependence on rain-fed agriculture and natural resources.

Approximately 68 per cent of Tanzania's 61.1 million citizens live below the poverty line of $1.25 a day. 32 per cent of the population are malnourished. The most prominent challenges Tanzania faces in poverty reduction are unsustainable harvesting of its natural resources, unchecked cultivation, climate change and water- source encroachment, according to the United Nations Development Programme (UNDP).

There are very few resources for Tanzanians in terms of credit services, infrastructure or availability to improved agricultural technologies, which further exacerbates hunger and poverty in the country according to the UNDP. Tanzania ranks 159 out of 187 countries in poverty according to the United Nation's Human Development Index (2014).

The 2019 World Bank report showed that in the last 10 years, poverty has reduced by 8 percentage points, from 34.4% in 2007 to 26.4% in 2018. A further report showed a reduction to 25.7% in 2020.

Agriculture

The Tanzanian economy is heavily based on agriculture, which in 2013 accounted for 24.5 per cent of gross domestic product, provides 85% of exports, and accounted for half of the employed workforce; The agricultural sector grew 4.3 per cent in 2012, less than half of the Millennium Development Goal target of 10.8%. 16.4 per cent of the land is arable, with 2.4 per cent of the land planted with permanent crops. Tanzania's economy relies on farming, but climate change has impacted their farming.

Maize was the largest food crop on the Tanzania mainland in 2013 (5.17 million tonnes), followed by cassava (1.94 million tonnes), sweet potatoes (1.88 million tonnes), beans (1.64 million tonnes), bananas (1.31 million tonnes), rice (1.31 million tonnes), and millet (1.04 million tonnes). Sugar was the largest cash crop on the mainland in 2013 (296,679 tonnes), followed by cotton (241,198 tonnes), cashew nuts (126,000 tonnes), tobacco (86,877 tonnes), coffee (48,000 tonnes), sisal (37,368 tonnes), and tea (32,422 tonnes). Beef was the largest meat product on the mainland in 2013 (299,581 tonnes), followed by lamb/mutton (115,652 tonnes), chicken (87,408 tonnes), and pork (50,814 tonnes).

According to the 2002 National Irrigation Master Plan, 29.4 million hectares in Tanzania are suitable for irrigation farming; however, only 310,745 hectares were actually being irrigated in June 2011.

Industry, energy and construction

Industry and construction is a major and growing component of the Tanzanian economy, contributing 22.2 per cent of GDP in 2013. This component includes mining and quarrying, manufacturing, electricity and natural gas, water supply, and construction. Mining contributed 3.3 per cent of GDP in 2013. The vast majority of the country's mineral export revenue comes from gold, accounting for 89 per cent of the value of those exports in 2013. It also exports sizeable quantities of gemstones, including diamonds and tanzanite. All of Tanzania's coal production, which totalled 106,000 short tons in 2012, is used domestically.

Only 15 per cent of Tanzanians had access to electric power in 2011, rising to 35.2 per cent in 2018. The government-owned Tanzania Electric Supply Company Limited (TANESCO) dominates the electric supply industry in Tanzania. The country generated 6.013 billion kilowatt hours (kWh) of electricity in 2013, a 4.2 per cent increase over the 5.771 billion kWh generated in 2012. Generation increased by 63 per cent between 2005 and 2012; Almost 18 per cent of the electricity generated in 2012 was lost because of theft and transmission and distribution problems. The electrical supply varies, particularly when droughts disrupt hydropower electric generation; rolling blackouts are implemented as necessary. The unreliability of the electrical supply has hindered the development of Tanzanian industry. In 2013, 49.7 per cent of Tanzania's electricity generation came from natural gas, 28.9 per cent from hydroelectric sources, 20.4 per cent from thermal sources, and 1.0 per cent from outside the country. The government has built a  gas pipeline from Mnazi Bay to Dar es Salaam. This pipeline was expected to allow the country to double its electricity generation capacity to 3,000 megawatts by 2016. The government's goal is to increase capacity to at least 10,000 megawatts by 2025.

According to PFC Energy, 25 to 30 trillion cubic feet of recoverable natural gas resources have been discovered in Tanzania since 2010, bringing the total reserves to over 43 trillion cubic feet by the end of 2013. The value of natural gas actually produced in 2013 was US$52.2 million, a 42.7 per cent increase over 2012.

Commercial production of gas from the Songo Songo Island field in the Indian Ocean commenced in 2004, thirty years after it was discovered there. Over 35 billion cubic feet of gas was produced from this field in 2013, with proven, probable, and possible reserves totalling 1.1 trillion cubic feet. The gas is transported by pipeline to Dar es Salaam. As of 27 August 2014, TANESCO owed the operator of this field, Orca Exploration Group Inc.

A newer natural gas field in Mnazi Bay in 2013 produced about one-seventh of the amount produced near Songo Songo Island but has proven, probable, and possible reserves of 2.2 trillion cubic feet. Virtually all of that gas is being used for electricity generation in Mtwara.

The Ruvuma and Nyuna regions of Tanzania have been explored mostly by the discovery company that holds a 75 per cent interest, Aminex, and has shown to hold in excess of 3.5 trillion cubic feet of natural gas. A pipeline connecting offshore natural gas fields to Tanzania's commercial capital Dar es Salaam was completed at the end of April 2015.

Tourism

Travel and tourism contributed 17.5 per cent of Tanzania's gross domestic product in 2016 and employed 11.0 per cent of the country's labour force (1,189,300 jobs) in 2013. Overall receipts rose from US$1.74 billion in 2004 to US$4.48 billion in 2013, and receipts from international tourists rose from US$1.255 billion in 2010 to US$2 billion in 2016. In 2016, 1,284,279 tourists arrived at Tanzania's borders compared to 590,000 in 2005. The vast majority of tourists visit Zanzibar or a "northern circuit" of Serengeti National Park, the Ngorongoro Conservation Area, Tarangire National Park, Lake Manyara National Park, and Mount Kilimanjaro. In 2013, the most visited national park was Serengeti (452,485 tourists), followed by Manyara (187,773) and Tarangire (165,949).

Banking
The Bank of Tanzania is the central bank of Tanzania and is primarily responsible for maintaining price stability, with a subsidiary responsibility for issuing the banknotes and coins of the Tanzanian shilling. At the end of 2013, the total assets of the Tanzanian banking industry were TSh 19.5 trillion, a 15 per cent increase over 2012.

Transport

Most transport in Tanzania is by road, with road transport constituting over 75 per cent of the country's freight traffic and 80 per cent of its passenger traffic. The  road system is in generally poor condition. Tanzania has two railway companies: TAZARA, which provides service between Dar es Salaam and Kapiri Mposhi (in a copper-mining district in Zambia), and Tanzania Railways Limited, which connects Dar es Salaam with central and northern Tanzania. Rail travel in Tanzania often entails slow journeys with frequent cancellations or delays, and the railways have a deficient safety record.

In Dar es Salaam, there is a huge project of rapid buses, Dar Rapid Transit (DART) which connects suburbs of Dar es Salaam city. The development of the DART system consists of six phases and is funded by the African Development Bank, the World Bank and the Government of Tanzania. The first phase began in April 2012, and it was completed in December 2015 and launched operations in May 2016.

Tanzania has four international airports, along with over 120 small airports or landing strips. Airport infrastructure tends to be in poor condition. Airlines in Tanzania include Air Tanzania, Precision Air, Fastjet, Coastal Aviation, and ZanAir.

Communications

In 2013, the communications sector was the fastest growing in Tanzania, expanding 22.8 per cent; however, the sector accounted for only 2.4 per cent of gross domestic product that year.

As of 2011, Tanzania had 56 mobile telephone subscribers per 100 inhabitants, a rate slightly above the sub-Saharan average. Very few Tanzanians have fixed-line telephones. Approximately 12 per cent of Tanzanians used the internet , though this number is growing rapidly. The country has a fibre-optic cable network that replaced unreliable satellite service, but internet bandwidth remains very low.

Water supply and sanitation 

Water supply and sanitation in Tanzania has been characterised by decreasing access to improved water sources in the 2000s (especially in urban areas), steady access to some form of sanitation (around 93 per cent since the 1990s), intermittent water supplies, and generally low quality of service. Many utilities are barely able to cover their operation and maintenance costs through revenues because of low tariffs and poor efficiency. There are significant regional differences, with the best performing utilities being Arusha, Moshi, and Tanga.

The government of Tanzania has embarked on a major sector reform process since 2002. An ambitious National Water Sector Development Strategy that promotes Integrated Water Resources Management and the development of urban and rural water supply was adopted in 2006. Decentralisation has meant that responsibility for water and sanitation service provision has shifted to local government authorities and is carried out by 20 urban utilities and about 100 district utilities, as well as by Community Owned Water Supply Organisations in rural areas.

These reforms have been backed by a significant increase of the budget starting in 2006, when the water sector was included among the priority sectors of the National Strategy for Growth and Reduction of Poverty. The Tanzanian water sector remains heavily dependent on external donors, with 88 per cent of the available funds being provided by external donor organisations. Results have been mixed. For example, a report by Deutsche Gesellschaft für Internationale Zusammenarbeit noted that "despite heavy investments brought in by the World Bank and the European Union, (the utility serving Dar es Salaam) has remained one of the worst performing water entities in Tanzania."

Economic statistics controversy

Two articles in the Economist in July 2020 raised doubts about official claims of economic growth: "If Tanzania's economy grew by almost 7% in the fiscal year to the end of June 2019, why did tax revenue fall by 1%? And why has bank lending to companies slumped? Private data are bad, too. In 2019 sales at the biggest brewer fell by 5%. Sales of cement by the two biggest producers were almost flat. None of these things is likely if growth is storming ahead. The discrepancies are so large that it is hard to avoid the conclusion that the government is lying."

Tim Staermose, a proponent of African investment, took issue with these data: "Some of these statements by The Economist, based on the evidence I have gathered from primary sources – namely, the statutory financial reports that listed companies in Tanzania are legally obligated to release – are simply not true. Bank lending to companies as far as I can see has not, 'slumped.' The two biggest banks in Tanzania, which between them account for approximately 40% of the banking sector, both reported strong loan growth in 2019. ... As for cement sales being 'almost flat,' again, this is total nonsense. ... In 2019 Twiga sold 6% more cement by volume than it did in 2018. In the first six months of 2020, Twiga already sold 8% more cement than it had done by the same stage in 2019. Again, these numbers are very consistent with an economy that's reported to be growing at around 7% per annum. ... [On] the 5% fall in beer sales in 2019 ... the published 2019 annual report by Tanzania Breweries Limited (TBL) will tell you there were one-off circumstances that largely drove the decline ... [which] resulted in sales falling. But TBL's profits actually rose in 2019."

Food and nutrition 

Poor nutrition remains a persistent problem within Tanzania and varies hugely throughout the country's regions. USAID reports that 16% of children are underweight and 34% experience stunted growth as a result of malnutrition. 10 regions house 58% of children suffering from stunted growth while 50% of acutely malnourished children can be found in 5 regions. Over a 5-year period, the Mara district of Tanzania saw a 15% reduction in stunting in children under 5 years old, falling from 46% to 31% in 2005 and 2010 respectively. Dodoma, on the other hand, saw a 7% increase in the prevalence of stunting in this age group, rising from 50% in 2005 to 57% in 2010. Overall availability of food does not necessarily contribute to overall stunting figures. Iringa, Mbeya and Rukwa regions, where overall availability of food is considered acceptable, still experience stunting incidents in excess of 50%. In some areas where food shortages are common, such as in the Tabora and Singida regions, stunting instances remain comparatively less than those seen in Iringa, Mbeya and Rukwa. The Tanzania Food and Nutrition Centre attributes these discrepancies to variance in maternal malnutrition, poor infant feeding practices, hygiene practices and poor healthcare services. Periods of drought can have significant impacts on the production of crops in Tanzania. Drought in East Africa has resulted in massive increases in the prices of food staples such as maize and sorghum, crops crucial to the nutrition of the majority of Tanzania's population.

Tanzania remains heavily agricultural, with 80% of the total population engaging in subsistence farming. Rural areas are subjected to increased food shortages in comparison to urbanised areas, with a survey carried out within the country in 2017 finding 84% of people in rural areas suffering food shortages over a 3-month period compared to 64% of residents in cities. This disparity between rural and city nutrition can be attributed to various factors; increased nutritional needs due to manual labour, more limited access to food as a result of poor infrastructure, high-susceptibility to the damaging effects of nature and the "Agricultural Productivity Gap". The Agricultural Productivity Gap postulates that "value added per worker" is often much lower within the agricultural sector than that found within non-agricultural sectors. Furthermore, allocation of labour within the agricultural sector is largely allocated ineffectively.

Programmes targeting hunger 
USAID programmes focusing on nutrition operate within the Morogoro, Dodoma, Iringa, Mbeya, Manyara, Songwe and Zanzibar regions of Tanzania. These "Feed the Future" programmes heavily invest in nutrition, infrastructure, policy, capacity of institutions and agriculture which is identified by the organisation as a key area of economic growth in the country. A Tanzanian government led initiative "Kilimo Kwanza" or "Agriculture First" aims to encourage investment into agriculture within the private sector and hopes to improve agricultural processes and development within the country by seeking the knowledge of young people and the innovation that they can potentially provide. During the 1990s, around 25% of Tanzania's population were provided access to iodised oil aimed to target iodine deficiency within expecting mothers, as result of studies showing the negative effects of in-utero iodine deficiency on cognitive development in children. Research showed that children of mothers with access to the supplement achieved on average greater than a third of a year more education than those who did not.

Programmes led by the World Food Programme operate within Tanzania. The Supplementary Feeding Programme (SFP) aims to target acute malnutrition by supplying blended food fortified with vitamins to pregnant women and mothers to children under 5 on a monthly basis. Pregnant women and mothers to children under 2 have access to the Mother and Child Health and Nutrition Programme's "Super Cereal" which is supplied with the intent of reducing stunting in children. World Food Programme supplementation remains the main food source for Tanzania's refugees. Super Cereal, Vegetable Oil, Pulses and Salt are supplied as part of the Protracted Relief and Recovery Operation to meet the average person's minimum daily caloric requirement of 2,100 kcal. UNICEF state that continued investment in nutrition within Tanzania is of the utmost importance: Estimates predict that Tanzania stands to lose $20 billion by 2025 if nutrition within the country remains at its current level, however improvements in nutrition could produce a gain of around $4.7 billion

Save the Children, with the help of UNICEF and Irish Aid funding created the Partnership for Nutrition in Tanzania (PANITA), in 2011. PANITA aims to use civil society organisations to target nutrition within the country. Alongside this, various sectors associated with nutrition are targeted such as agriculture, water, sanitation, education, economic development and social progress. PANITA is responsible for ensuring significant attention is given to nutrition in development plans and budgets created on national and regional levels within Tanzania. Since its conception, PANITA has grown from 94 to 306 participating civil society organisations nationwide. Agriculture within Tanzania is targeted by the Irish Aid led initiative Harnessing Agriculture for Nutrition Outcomes (HANO), which aims to merge nutrition initiatives with agriculture in the Lindi District of the country. The project aims to reduce stunting by 10% in children aged 0 to 23 months.

Science and technology

Tanzania's first "National Science and Technology Policy" was adopted in 1996. The objective of the government's "Vision 2025" (1998) document was to "transform the economy into a strong, resilient and competitive one, buttressed by science and technology".

Under the umbrella of the One UN Initiative, UNESCO and Tanzanian government departments and agencies formulated a series of proposals in 2008 for revising the "National Science and Technology Policy". The total reform budget of US$10 million was financed from the One UN fund and other sources. UNESCO provided support for mainstreaming science, technology, and innovation into the new "National Growth and Poverty Reduction Strategy" for the mainland and Zanzibar namely, Mkukuta II and Mkuza II, including in the field of tourism.

Tanzania's revised science policy was published in 2010. Entitled "National Research and Development Policy", it recognises the need to improve the process of prioritisation of research capacities, develop international co-operation in strategic areas of research and development, and improve planning for human resources. It also makes provisions for the establishment of a National Research Fund. This policy was, in turn, reviewed in 2012 and 2013.

In 2010, Tanzania devoted 0.38 per cent of GDP to research and development. The global average in 2013 was 1.7 per cent of GDP. Tanzania had 69 researchers (in head counts) per million population in 2010. In 2014, Tanzania counted 15 publications per million inhabitants in internationally catalogued journals, according to Thomson Reuters' Web of Science (Science Citation Index Expanded). The average for sub-Saharan Africa was 20 publications per million inhabitants and the global average 176 publications per million inhabitants. Tanzania was ranked 90th in the Global Innovation Index in 2021, up from 97th in 2019.

Demographics

According to the 2012 census, the total population of Tanzania was 44,928,923. The under-15 age group represented 44.1% of the population.

The population distribution in Tanzania is significantly uneven. Most people live on the northern border or the coast, with much of the remainder of the country being sparsely populated.

Approximately 70% of the population is rural, although this percentage has been declining since at least 1967. Dar es Salaam (population 4,364,541) is the largest city and commercial capital. The capital of the country and economic centre of Tanzania, Dodoma (population 410,956) is located in central Tanzania, and hosts the National Assembly.

At the time of the foundation of the United Republic of Tanzania in 1964, the child mortality rate was 335 deaths per 1,000 live births. Since independence, the rate of child deaths has declined to 62 per 1000 births.

The population consists of about 125 ethnic groups. The Sukuma, Nyamwezi, Chagga, and Haya peoples each have a population exceeding 1 million. Approximately 99 per cent of Tanzanians are of native African descent, with small numbers of Arab, European, and Asian descent. The majority of Tanzanians, including the Sukuma and the Nyamwezi, are Bantu.

The population also includes people of Arab and Indian origin, and small European and Chinese communities. Many also identify as Shirazis. Thousands of Arabs and Indians were massacred during the Zanzibar Revolution of 1964. As of 1994, the Asian community numbered 50,000 on the mainland and 4,000 on Zanzibar. An estimated 70,000 Arabs and 10,000 Europeans lived in Tanzania.

Some albinos in Tanzania have been the victims of violence in recent years. Attacks are often to hack off the limbs of albinos in the perverse superstitious belief that possessing the bones of albinos will bring wealth. The country has banned witch doctors to try to prevent the practice, but it has continued and albinos remain targets.

According to 2010 Tanzanian government statistics, the total fertility rate in Tanzania was 5.4 children born per woman, with 3.7 in urban mainland areas, 6.1 in rural mainland areas, and 5.1 in Zanzibar. For all women aged 45–49, 37.3 per cent had given birth to eight or more children, and for currently married women in that age group, 45.0 per cent had given birth to that many children.

Religion

Official statistics on religion are unavailable because religious surveys were eliminated from government census reports after 1967. Tanzania's religious field is dominated by Christianity and Islam as well as of different African traditional religions connected to ethnic customs. The word for religion in Swahili, dini, generally apply to the world religions of Christianity and Islam meaning that followers of traditional African religions are considered to be of "no religion". Religious belonging is often ambiguous, with some people adhering to multiple religious identities at the same time (for instance being Christian but also following African traditional rituals) something which suggests that religious boundaries are flexible and contextual.

According to a 2014 estimate by the CIA World Factbook, 61.4% of the population was Christian, 35.2% was Muslim, 1.8% practised traditional African religions, 1.4% were unaffiliated with any religion, and 0.2% followed other religions. Nearly the entire population of Zanzibar is Muslim. Of Muslims, 16% are Ahmadiyya, 20% are non-denominational Muslims, 40% are Sunni, 20 per cent are Shia, and 4% are Sufi.

Within the Christian community the Catholic Church is the largest group (51% all Christians). Among the Protestants, the large number of Lutherans and Moravians points to the German missionary past of the country, while the number of Anglicans point to the British missionary history of Tanganyika. A growing number have adopted Pentecostalism, and Adventists likewise have an increasing presence because of external missionary activities from Scandinavia and the United States, especially during the first part of the 20th century. All of them have had some influence in varying degrees from the Walokole movement (East African Revival), which has also been fertile ground for the spread of charismatic and Pentecostal groups.

There are also active communities of other religious groups, primarily on the mainland, such as Buddhists, Hindus, and Bahá'ís.

Languages

More than 100 languages are spoken in Tanzania, making it the most linguistically diverse country in East Africa. Among the languages spoken are four of Africa's language families: Bantu, Cushitic, Nilotic, and Khoisan. There are no de jure official languages in Tanzania.

Swahili is used in parliamentary debate, in the lower courts, and as a medium of instruction in primary school. English is used in foreign trade, in diplomacy, in higher courts, and as a medium of instruction in secondary and higher education, The Tanzanian government, however, has plans to discontinue English as a language of instruction. In connection with his Ujamaa social policies, President Nyerere encouraged the use of Swahili to help unify the country's many ethnic groups. Approximately 10 per cent of Tanzanians speak Swahili as a first language, and up to 90 per cent speak it as a second language. Many educated Tanzanians are trilingual, also speaking English. The widespread use and promotion of Swahili is contributing to the decline of smaller languages in the country. Young children increasingly speak Swahili as a first language, particularly in urban areas. Ethnic community languages (ECL) other than Kiswahili are not allowed as a language of instruction. Nor are they taught as a subject, though they might be used unofficially in some cases in initial education. Television and radio programmes in an ECL are prohibited, and it is nearly impossible to get permission to publish a newspaper in an ECL. There is no department of local or regional African Languages and Literatures at the University of Dar es Salaam.

Arabic is co-official in Zanzibar.

The Sandawe people speak a language that may be related to the Khoe languages of Botswana and Namibia, while the language of the Hadzabe people, although it has similar click consonants, is arguably a language isolate. The language of the Iraqw people is Cushitic.

Education and Libraries

In 2015, the literacy rate in Tanzania was 77.9% for people aged 15 and over (83.2% males, 73.1% females),. Education is compulsory until children reach age 15. In 2020, 97% completed primary (98.4% females and 95.5% males), 28.3% completed secondary (30% females and 27% males), and 8% completed tertiary education (7% females and 8.5% males).

The Tanzania Library Services Board operates twenty-one regional, eighteen district, and one divisional library.

Healthcare

, life expectancy at birth was 61 years. The under-five mortality rate in 2012 was 54 per 1,000 live births. The maternal mortality rate in 2013 was estimated at 410 per 100,000 live births. Prematurity and malaria were tied in 2010 as the leading cause of death in children under 5 years old. The other leading causes of death for these children were, in decreasing order, malaria, diarrhoea, HIV, and measles.

Malaria in Tanzania causes death and disease and has a "huge economic impact". There were approximately 11.5 million cases of clinical malaria in 2008. In 2007–08, malaria prevalence among children aged 6 months to 5 years was highest in the Kagera Region (41.1 per cent) on the western shore of Lake Victoria and lowest in the Arusha Region (0.1 per cent).

According to the 2010 Tanzania Demographic and Health Survey 2010, 15 per cent of Tanzanian women had undergone female genital mutilation (FGM) and 72 per cent of Tanzanian men had been circumcised. FGM is most common in the Manyara, Dodoma, Arusha, and Singida regions and nonexistent in Zanzibar. The prevalence of male circumcision was above 90 per cent in the eastern (Dar es Salaam, Pwani, and Morogoro regions), northern (Kilimanjaro, Tanga, Arusha, and Manyara regions), and central areas (Dodoma and Singida regions) and below 50 per cent only in the southern highlands zone (Mbeya, Iringa, and Rukwa regions).

2012 data showed that 53 per cent of the population used improved drinking water sources (defined as a source that "by nature of its construction and design, is likely to protect the source from outside contamination, in particular from faecal matter") and 12 per cent used improved sanitation facilities (defined as facilities that "likely hygienically separates human excreta from human contact" but not including facilities shared with other households or open to public use).

Women

Women and men have equality before the law.
The government signed the Convention on the Elimination of All Forms of Discrimination against Women (CEDAW) in 1985.
Nearly 3 out of ten females reported having experienced sexual violence before the age of 18.
 The prevalence of female genital mutilation has decreased.
School girls are reinstated back to school after delivery.
The Police Force administration strives to separate the Gender Desks from normal police operations to enhance confidentiality of the processing of women victims of abuse.
Most of the abuses and violence against women and children occurs at the family level.
The Constitution of Tanzania requires that women constitute at least 30% of all elected members of National Assembly. The gender differences in education and training have implications later in life of these women and girls.
Unemployment is higher for females than for males. The right of a female employee to maternity leave is guaranteed in labour law.

Culture

Music 

As in other countries, the music in Tanzania is constantly undergoing changes, and varies by location, people, settings and occasion. The five music genres in Tanzania, as defined by BASATA are, ngoma, dansi, kwaya, and taarab, with bongo flava being added in 2001. Singeli has since the mid-2000s been an unofficial music of uswahilini, unplanned communities in Dar es Salaam, and is the newest mainstream genre since 2020.

Ngoma (Bantu, meaning dance, drum and event) is a traditional dance music that has been the most widespread music in Tanzania. Dansi is urban jazz or band music. Taarab is sung Kiswahili poetry accompanied by a band, typically string, in which audience is often, but not always, encouraged to dance and clap. Kwaya is choir music originally limited to church during colonization, but now an secular part of education, social, and political events.

Bongo flava is Tanzanian pop music originating in the early 2000s from muziki wa kizazi kipya, meaning "Music of the new generation", which originated in the late 1980s. Kizazi kipya's dominant influences were reggae, RnB, and hip hop, where as the later bongo flava's dominant influences are taarab and dansi. Three recent influence on bongo flava are Afropop in the 2010s, as well as amapiano from South Africa and singeli from Tanzania, both since 2020. Singeli is a ngoma music that originated in Manzese, an uswahilini in north-west Dar es Salaam. A MC performs over fast tempo taarab music, often at between 200 and 300 beats per minute (BPM) while females dance. Styles between MC gender typically differ significantly. Male MCs usually perform in fast-paced rap, while female MCs usually perform kwaya.

From independence until 1993, all recording and distribution of music was strictly managed by BASATA, primarily through Radio Tanzania Dar es Salaam (RTD). Only the 4 Tanzanian genres were permitted to be recorded or broadcast, which at the time was ngoma, taarab, kwaya and dansi. The Broadcasting Services Act of 1993 allowed private broadcast networks and recording studios. In the few years prior to the 1993 Act hip hop had been getting somewhat established in Dar es Salaam, Arusha and Mwanza. It was transitioning from English performances of hip hop originating in uzunguni, rich areas like Oysterbay and Masaki with international schools, to Kiswahili performances of kizazi kipya, originating in uswahilini Following the opening of the radio waves, bongo flava spreading throughout the country, and the rest of the Great Lakes.

National anthem 

The Tanzanian national anthem is "Mungu Ibariki Africa" (God Bless Africa). It has kiswahili lyrics adapted for "Nkosi Sikelel' iAfrika" composed by South African composer Enoch Sontonga in 1897. "Nkosi Sikelel' iAfrika" became a pan-African song adapted into the current national anthems for Tanzania, Zambia, and following the end of apartheid South Africa. It was previously used in the national anthems for Zimbabwe and Namibia, but has since been replaced by original new anthems. Another patriotic song is Tanzania, Tanzania.

Literature 

Tanzania's literary culture is primarily oral. Major oral literary forms include folktales, poems, riddles, proverbs, and songs. The greatest part of Tanzania's recorded oral literature is in Swahili, even though each of the country's languages has its own oral tradition. The country's oral literature has been declining because of the breakdown of the multigenerational social structure, making transmission of oral literature more difficult, and because increasing modernisation has been accompanied by the devaluation of oral literature.

Books in Tanzania are often expensive and hard to come by. Most Tanzanian literature is in Swahili or English. Major figures in Tanzanian written literature include Shaaban Robert (considered the father of Swahili literature), Muhammed Saley Farsy, Faraji Katalambulla, Adam Shafi Adam, Muhammed Said Abdalla, Peter K. Palangyo, Said Ahmed Mohammed Khamis, Mohamed Suleiman Mohamed, Euphrase Kezilahabi, Gabriel Ruhumbika, Ebrahim Hussein, May Materru Balisidya, Fadhy Mtanga, Abdulrazak Gurnah, and Penina O. Mlama.

Painting and sculpture 

Two Tanzanian art styles have achieved international recognition. The Tingatinga school of painting, founded by Edward Said Tingatinga, consists of brightly coloured enamel paintings on canvas, generally depicting people, animals, or daily life. After Tingatinga's death in 1972, other artists adopted and developed his style, with the genre now being the most important tourist-oriented style in East Africa.

Historically, there were limited opportunities for formal European art training in Tanzania and many aspiring Tanzanian artists left the country to pursue their vocation.

Sports 

Football is very popular throughout the country. The most popular professional football clubs in Dar es Salaam are the Young Africans F.C. and Simba S.C. The Tanzania Football Federation is the governing body for football in the country.

Other popular sports include basketball, netball, boxing, volleyball, athletics, and rugby. The National Sports Council also known as Baraza la Michezo la Taifa is the governing body for sports in the country under the Ministry of Information, Youth, Sports and Culture.

Cinema 
Tanzania has a popular film industry known as "Bongo Movie". The music industry is known as "Bongo Flava" which is in itself also a niche genre of music in Tanzania.

See also

 Outline of Tanzania
 COVID-19 pandemic in Tanzania

Notes

References

Sources

External links

 
 
 
 
 Basic Statistics of Tanzania published as Open data by the National Bureau of Statistics

 
1964 establishments in Tanzania
Republics in the Commonwealth of Nations
Countries in Africa
East African countries
English-speaking countries and territories
Least developed countries
Former German colonies
Member states of the African Union
Member states of the Commonwealth of Nations
Member states of the United Nations
States and territories established in 1964
Swahili-speaking countries and territories